Nóra Hoffmann (born 8 April 1985 in Budapest) is a Hungarian ice dancer. With Maxim Zavozin, she is the 2010 Cup of Russia silver medalist and a two-time (2009, 2010) Hungarian national champion. With Attila Elek, she is a two-time (2003–2004) World Junior silver medalist, the 2003 JGP Final champion, and a five-time (2003–2007) Hungarian national champion.

Career

With Elek 
Hoffmann trained in both ice dancing and single skating until age 11 when she broke her leg on a jump. She was paired with Attila Elek by coaches in the early 1990s. They twice won the silver medal at Junior Worlds, in 2003 and 2004. Hoffmann / Elek were silver medalists at the 2002–2003 Junior Grand Prix Final and won the title in 2003–2004. On the senior Grand Prix series, their best placement was 5th at 2006 Cup of Russia. Their best finish at senior Worlds was 15th in 2005. They competed at the 2006 Olympics, finishing 17th. During the warm-up at 2006 Worlds, another couple was performing a lift nearby and the woman's skates accidentally cut Hoffmann's back and elbow. Despite the pain, Hoffmann skated with Elek a few minutes later and they finished 18th.

At the 2007 European Championships, they were 7th after the original dance but they were forced to withdraw – Elek broke his leg during the morning practice before the free dance. They split up at the end of the season.

With Zavozin 
Hoffman teamed up with Maxim Zavozin in September 2007. They had competed against each other at 2004 Junior Worlds, with Zavozin and his partner in third behind Hoffmann and Elek.

During the 2008–09 season, Hoffmann / Zavozin did not compete on the Grand Prix circuit but won the 2009 Hungarian national title and were given a berth to the 2009 European Championships. Despite Zavozin having a fever, they skated in the original dance at Europeans, but his condition worsened and they had to withdraw before the free dance. They missed the 2009 World Championships due to a serious head injury to Hoffmann while training in the U.S. on 4 March 2009. Hoffmann stumbled over an open gate and cracked her skull, losing consciousness and suffering three hemorrhages. She had a long stay in hospital and was given morphine for the pain but, hoping to compete at Worlds, she eventually decided to refuse it to avoid violating doping rules.

Zavozin stayed with her at the hospital until her boyfriend arrived to take her back to Hungary. Oxygen therapy helped reactivate her brain cells, "This therapy brought me back to a normal life. Until then I was just sleeping or staring at nothing. In the oxygen tent my vitality returned and not so much later I even dared to go back on the ice." She returned to the ice in the second half of May 2009 and eventually began training again with Zavozin, although they had to omit lifts and spins for a while. The accident also resulted in a torn nerve in the sciatic muscle which took half a year to heal.

During the 2009–10 season, Hoffmann / Zavozin missed the Grand Prix series. They competed at the 2010 European Championships where they placed 10th. They qualified for the 2010 Olympics where they finished 13th. At the 2010 World Championships, they finished in 10th.

In the 2010–11 season, Hoffmann / Zavozin made their first appearance together on the Grand Prix series. Their first event was 2010 Cup of China where they placed fourth. At 2010 Cup of Russia, they won silver, their first medal on the senior Grand Prix series. They finished third in both the short and free dance and set personal best scores in both. They competed at the 2011 European Championships where they finished 8th after receiving some low levels from the technical panel and a small stumble. On 30 March 2011, Hoffmann was hospitalized with an unknown illness in Moscow where she was training. Doctors later said they were fairly certain it was pyelonephritis. She and Zavozin had to withdraw from the 2011 World Championships. They did not compete in the 2011–2012 season but said in March 2012 that they were considering returning to competition.

Programs

With Zavozin

With Elek

Results

With Zavozin

With Elek

References

External links 

 
 Nora Hoffmann / Maxim Zavozin at IceNetwork

Navigation 

1985 births
Living people
Hungarian female ice dancers
Olympic figure skaters of Hungary
Figure skaters at the 2006 Winter Olympics
Figure skaters at the 2010 Winter Olympics
Figure skaters from Budapest
World Junior Figure Skating Championships medalists